Ivan Kovačec (born 27 June 1988) is a Croatian footballer who plays as a winger for Drava Ptuj.

Club career

K League 
On 9 July 2015, Kovačec joined the K League 1 side Ulsan Hyundai. On 18 June 2017, Kovačec's contract was officially terminated by mutual consent.

On 13 July 2017, Kovačec joined the K League 1 side FC Seoul.

Return to Europe 
He has had several spells in Austria, his most recent with ASV Siegendorf.

Honours
Pasching
Austrian Cup: 2012–13

Notes

References

External links

1988 births
Living people
Footballers from Zagreb
Croatian footballers
Association football wingers
Croatian expatriate footballers
NK Zagorec Krapina players
NK Križevci players
NK Hrvatski Dragovoljac players
SV Stegersbach players
FC Juniors OÖ players
FC Liefering players
LASK players
SC Rheindorf Altach players
Ulsan Hyundai FC players
FC Seoul players
NK Rudeš players
Panachaiki F.C. players
SV Ried players
NK Drava Ptuj (2004) players
Austrian Regionalliga players
2. Liga (Austria) players
Austrian Football Bundesliga players
K League 1 players
First Football League (Croatia) players
Austrian Landesliga players
Football League (Greece) players
Croatian Football League players
Slovenian Second League players
Expatriate footballers in Austria
Croatian expatriate sportspeople in Austria
Expatriate footballers in South Korea
Croatian expatriate sportspeople in South Korea
Expatriate footballers in Greece
Croatian expatriate sportspeople in Greece
Expatriate footballers in Slovenia
Croatian expatriate sportspeople in Slovenia